Lil Poldi Terselius (5 November 1944 – 26 October 2021) was a Swedish stage and film actress. At the 14th Guldbagge Awards she won the award for Best Actress for her role in Games of Love and Loneliness. She won the Eugene O'Neill Award in 2000.

References

External links

Lil Terselius, Dramaten

Swedish stage actresses
Swedish film actresses
Actresses from Stockholm
1944 births
2021 deaths
Eugene O'Neill Award winners
Litteris et Artibus recipients
Best Actress Guldbagge Award winners
20th-century Swedish actresses
21st-century Swedish actresses